Jaguari River may refer to:

 Jaguari River (Caí River)
 Jaguari River (Ibicuí River)
 Jaguari River (Paraíba do Sul)
 Jaguari River (Piracicaba River)

See also 
 Jaguari Mirim River
 Jaguari